The Construction, Forestry, Maritime, Mining and Energy Union (CFMMEU, though most commonly still referred to as CFMEU) is Australia's main trade union in construction, forestry, maritime, mining, energy, textile, clothing and footwear production. The CFMMEU is affiliated with the Australian Council of Trade Unions, with the Australian Labor Party and with the World Federation of Trade Unions.

The CFMMEU has offices in all capital cities in Australia and in many major regional centres with the national office of the union being in Melbourne. Before the 2018 merger, the CFMEU had an estimated 120,000 members and employed around 400 full-time staff and officials.

In March 2018, a two-year long process ended resulting in a merger between the old CFMEU, the Maritime Union of Australia and the Textile, Clothing and Footwear Union of Australia. The new CFMMEU has a membership of approximately 144,000, 1% of the Australian workforce, with combined assets of $310 million and annual revenue of approximately $146 million.

Leadership

 National
 National Secretary - Dave Noonan
 National President - Jade Ingham
 Assistant National Secretary - Andrew Sutherland
 National Divisions
 National Construction Division Secretary - Dave Noonan
 National Mining & Energy Division Secretary - Graham Kelly
 National Manufacturing Division Secretary - Michael O'Connor, who also part-owns UComms, a market research and opinion polling company, being a non-beneficiary shareholder of the company on behalf of the union
 National Maritime Division Secretary - Paddy Crumlin
 Other
 John Setka is the Victorian state secretary of the CFMEU - Construction division.
 Ralph Edwards is the Victorian state president of the CFMEU - Construction division.
 Gerry Ayers is the Victorian Health & Safety Unit Manager of the CFMEU - Construction division.

Divisions
The CFMMEU is structured into four divisions, each operating largely autonomously. Each division has its own discrete set of rules. Members of divisions are also divided into either districts or branches. Elections for office positions within the organisation, for which the term of office is four years, are predominantly conducted by the AEC. The Mining and Energy Division, however, holds exemptions from having their elections conducted by the AEC and from the postal ballot provisions under the RO Act. The supreme governing body is the National Conference, which consists of members of each divisional executive. There is also a national executive, National Executive Committee, Divisional Conferences and Divisional Executives.

Construction and General Division

History
The Construction and General Division was formed in the early 1990s with the creation of the national CFMEU. The creation of a single building union had been a policy objective of various building unions for decades with records showing the Queensland Branch of the Operative Painters and Decorators Union (OPDU) carried resolutions calling for a single industry union to be created as early as the 1920s.  The rationale behind this policy position was the logical view that members would be better represented by a larger industry-based union rather than the traditional craft unions.

The largest amalgamating union, the Building Workers' Industrial Union (BWIU) was itself the result of numerous amalgamations over several decades between 1946 and 1992. The coverage of the BWIU included numerous craft unions representing building tradespeople including bricklayers, carpenters, plasterers, tilers, stonemasons and various skilled non-trades construction workers.  In the late 1980s the BWIU increased its coverage to include other construction workers such as steel fixers, concreters, construction labourers and trades assistants following the de-registration of the Builders Labourers Federation (BLF).

The division also has members working off-site in manufacturing workplaces such as shopfitting workshops, joinery shops and other establishments involved in the pre-fabrication of materials used in the construction process.  Members also work in brick, tile and pottery manufacturing and in Queensland, the union covers furnishing trades as there is no formal Forestry Division in the State, due to the Australian Workers' Union's historical coverage of this industry.  The Queensland Branch does, however have a presence in Queensland's forestry sector with CFMEU members employed by the State Government working for the Department of Primary Industries.

With the absorption of the Federated Engine Drivers and Firemens Association of Australasia (FEDFA) which had coverage of crane drivers, plant operators, and other construction workers, the Construction and General Division has moved closer to fulfilling the policy objective of creating a single industry union for construction workers.

Political Activity
The CFMMEU is one of the most powerful unions in the Labor Left faction of the Australian Labor Party.
The Construction Division is often associated with the left faction of the Australian labour movement, but during the 2010 Federal election the CFMEU and AMWU donated a total of $60,000 to the Greens.

Each State division operates with autonomy, which results in differing services being offered to members.

The NSW Branch of the CFMEU General and Construction Division has an estimated 5,000 members and the Victorian Branch around 9,500.

In August 2010, the CFMEU donated over $1.2 million to political activist group GetUp! to pay for TV airtime for a women's rights ad-spot condemning Tony Abbott and the Liberal Party.

In the 2013 Election, the CFMEU donated $50,000 to the Greens party in the ACT.

In 2019, the construction division donated $100,000 to the 2019–20 Australian bushfire season recovery effort.

Manufacturing Division (formally Forestry and Furnishing Products Division)

The CFMMEU Forestry and Furnishing Products Division was first registered as a Federal Organisation 21 August 1907, as the Federated Sawmill, Timber-yard and Woodworkers Employees Association of Australasia.

The Union's name was changed in 1913 to the Amalgamated Timber Workers Union of Australia, and again in 1918 to the Australian Timber Workers Union.

In late 1990 a ballot was conducted by members of the Australian Timber Workers Union and the Pulp and Paper Workers Federation of Australia endorsing the amalgamation of both Unions to form the Australian Timber and Allied Industries Union.

Another ballot was conducted in mid-1991 on the amalgamation between the Australian Timber and Allied Industries Union and the Building Workers Industrial Union. This endorsement supported the first stage in the development of what is now the Construction, Forestry, Mining and Energy Union. The Forest and Furnishing Products Division represents 20,000 members nationally.

In March 2018 (after amalgamating with the TCFUA), CFMEU Forestry and Furnishing Products Division became the CFMEU Manufacturing Division.

Mining and Energy Division

The Mining and Energy Division consists of a number of unions which have amalgamated. The largest union to contribute to the formation of the division was the Australian Coal and Shale Employees' Federation (ACSEF) (often known as the Miners Federation) which had a continuous history dating back to 1915.  Predecessors to the ACSEF had existed on and off since the 1850s.

Industries covered by the Mining and Energy Division include the coal industry, coal ports, the metalliferous mining industry, electric power generation, oil and gas and the small coke industry.

The Coal Industry: The coal industry is the majority of the Mining and Energy Divisions' coverage. Of more than 16,500 members around 13,000 work in the coal industry. The CFMEU is the primary union for the coal mining industry.
 Coal Ports:  The union represents most workers (approximately 500) at export coal ports located along the east coast of Australia
 Metalliferous Mining: The Division covers most metalliferous miners in Broken Hill where silver, lead and zinc ores are mined. There are around 400 members at Broken Hill. Other mines are largely covered by the AWU.  Through the amalgamation with the FEDFA, the division also has around 1,500 members at metalliferous mines in Western Australia, South Australia, Tasmania and Queensland.
 Oil, gas and electricity: The division has around 2,200 members employed in power stations, oil refineries and other parts of the oil and gas production chain. This division is the major union representing workers in the Victorian power generation industry.
 The Coke Industry: This industry as a stand-alone commercial industry is quite small in Australia. Most coke production is tied to iron and steel operations. There are stand-alone coke works on the South Coast of NSW (north of Wollongong) and in Bowen in Northern Queensland. The Mining and Energy Division covers the cokeworks on the south coast and the AWU covers the Bowen site. The CFMEU has approximately 50 members in the coke industry.

Maritime Union of Australia Division

The Maritime Union of Australia Division consists of the amalgamated Maritime Union of Australia. As of 2017, the division represents 16,000 workers associated with Australian ports.

History
In September 2019, the MUA division announced that it would go on strike during the global Climate Strike during September 20, being "the first known instance of workers taking industrial action to attend the rallies".

Political Activity 
In the 2018 Victorian Election, the Maritime Union of Australia Division donated an unknown amount to the Victorian Socialists campaign.

Recent events

Building and construction industry regulation

In 2001, the Howard Government set up the Royal Commission into the Building and Construction Industry (commonly known as the Cole Royal Commission). The Commission and its findings were largely condemned by the Labor Party and the Greens which argued that the terms of reference were too narrow. The CFMEU asserted that the purpose of the Commission was a "witch-hunt" to reduce the power of the CFMEU rather than to investigate crime. The General and Construction Division of the union stopped some corruption within the union. Justice Cole found 392 cases of unlawful conduct; 98 cases were passed on to prosecution authorities by the Commonwealth Attorney-General, of which 26 were considered breaches of criminal law.

As a result of the Commission's findings the Howard Government established the Office of the Australian Building and Construction Commissioner (commonly known as the ABCC) in 2005. It had a wide range of powers, including compelling testimony under oath, with penalties of up to $22,000 for individuals and $110,000 for corporations and unions apply for breaches of the Building and Construction Industry Improvement Act 2005. The ABCC was abolished in 2012 by the Gillard Government and was replaced by the Fair Work Building and Construction. In 2015 the Abbott Government attempted to reinstate the ABCC, but the legislation failed to pass the two houses of Parliament. A further attempt to pass the legislation was unsuccessfully made by the Turnbull Government in March 2016. After the two failed attempts to reintroduce the ABCC, in December 2016 Prime Minister Malcolm Turnbull called the double dissolution 2016 federal election. Following the election, the reelected Turnbull Government was successful in reinstating the ABCC with the vote of Senators Pauline Hanson's One Nation, Nick Xenophon Team and Derryn Hinch.

Under WorkChoices, situations where industrial action could take place were reduced. The CFMEU and workers had to prove a workplace was unsafe to put a stop to work on a site which has not happened to date.

Construction, Forestry, Mining and Energy Union v BHP Coal Pty Ltd
During 2011 and 2012, BHP Coal and its employees were negotiating about a new enterprise agreement to apply to BHP Coal's operations at various mines, including the Saraji mine.  For the purpose of supporting or advancing their claims, employees of BHP Coal took protected industrial action in the form of work stoppages and overtime bans.  There was a seven-day work stoppage between 15 and 22 February 2012. During this stoppage, members of the CFMEU who were employed at the Saraji mine, including Mr Doevendans, participated in protests beside the road leading into the mine property.  Standing behind barriers BHP Coal had erected at the side of the road, the protesters held up signs which the CFMEU had provided and waved the signs at those who were driving into the mine.  The signs were directly or indirectly critical of BHP Coal and of those who were driving into the mine.  On four occasions over three days, Mr Doevendans held up a sign that read:  "No principles Scabs No guts." Some employees of BHP Coal complained to management about the scabs sign. Following some interactions with management, Mr Doevendans' employment with BHP was terminated.

On appeal to the High Court of Australia, it was held that the dismissal of Mr Doevendans was permissible under the Fair Work Act 2009.

Amalgamations
The federal division of the Federated Saw Mill, Timber Yard and General Wood Workers Employees' Association changed its name to the Amalgamated Timber Workers' Union of Australia. The former union had been registered federally in 1907 and had registered branches in Victoria, Adelaide, New South Wales, Western Australia and Tasmania. Although the organisation was deregistered in 1918 its members formed a new union, the Australian Timber Workers' Union, the same year. The new union extended coverage to workers in box and case factories, saw makers' shops, joiners' workshops, carpenters, implement workers and wood-working machinists. In 1940 the union filed an application and succeeded in extending its coverage to most workers employed in the timber and wood industry including cabinet makers and furniture factories. In 1991 it amalgamated with the Pulp & Paper Workers' Federation of Australia to form the Australian Timber & Allied Industries Union. Later in the year amalgamation with the Building Workers' Industrial Union of Australia created the ATAIU & BWIU Amalgamated Union. Further amalgamations eventually saw this organisation become part of the Construction Forestry Mining & Energy Union in 1993.

Since late 2015, the Maritime Union of Australia and CFMEU have been in merger talks to create 'Australia's most powerful union'.

On 29 February 2016 at the MUA national conference, delegates voted unanimously in favour of negotiations for a merger with the CFMEU. In August 2017, the Turnbull government introduced tough new laws targeting the CFMEU, with broad powers to deregister unions, disqualify officials and block unions from merging if they repeatedly breach industrial laws. The proposed law failed to pass the Senate. The Fair Work Commission approved the merger in March 2018 of the CFMEU, MUA and the Textile, Clothing and Footwear Union of Australia (TCFUA). The merger had been opposed by business groups, including Master Builders Australia, and by the federal government. In November 2018, the Australian Mines and Metals Association appealed to the Federal Court of Australia against the merger. The appeal was dismissed in December.

See also

Solidarity Park
One Big Union (concept)
Office of the Australian Building and Construction Commissioner (2005–2012 agency)
Fair Work Building and Construction (2012–2016 agency)
Australian Building and Construction Commission (2016–present agency)
Royal Commission into trade union governance and corruption

References

External links
Construction, Forestry, Mining and Energy Union official website
CFMEU Construction and General Division official website
Australian Council of Trade Unions official website
Australian Trade Union Archives entry
CFMEU Victoria Branch official website
CFMEU Queensland-Northern Territory Branch official website
CFMEU Western Australia Branch official website
CFMEU NSW Branch official website

Trade unions in Australia
Energy industry trade unions
Energy in Australia
World Federation of Trade Unions
Mining trade unions
Mining organisations in Australia
Trade unions established in 1992
1992 establishments in Australia